Orlando Brown (born December 4, 1987) is an American actor, rapper, and singer. He is best known for his roles as Cadet Kevin 'Tiger' Dunne in Major Payne, 3J Winslow in Family Matters, Max in Two of a Kind. He was the title protagonist in both the Waynehead (as Damey Wayne) and Fillmore! (as Cornelius Fillmore) animated series. He also played Sticky Webb in The Proud Family and Eddie Thomas in That's So Raven.

Early life
Orlando Brown was born in 1987 in Los Angeles, California.

Acting career 
Orlando Brown made his acting debut in 1995 as Cadet Kevin 'Tiger' Dunne in Major Payne. In 1998, he co-starred with Mary-Kate Olsen and Ashley Olsen in Two of a Kind. In 1996, he was cast as 3J Winslow in Family Matters. He began voice acting in 1996 when he starred as a childhood version of Damon Wayans in Waynehead. For Disney he starred in That's So Raven, Max Keeble's Big Move, "Eddie's Million Dollar movie Bloody Hands. After leaving Disney in 2007, Orlando decided to concentrate on his music career.

Legal issues 
On February 28, 2016, in Torrance, California, Brown was arrested and later charged with domestic battery, obstruction of justice, drug possession with intent to sell, and possession of contraband in jail, following an altercation with his then-girlfriend in public. Police were called to the scene after he struck her in the parking lot of a police station and he was found by officers to be in possession of methamphetamine, a stimulant drug, at the time of the incident. Brown failed to appear for a scheduled court date in relation to the charges and a warrant was issued for his arrest; he was ultimately taken into custody by police on March 18, 2016, in Barstow, California, after police were called to a private residence in response to complaints of a domestic disturbance between Brown, his girlfriend, and his girlfriend's mother and subsequently faced additional charges of domestic battery, drug possession, and resisting arrest.

Following his release from jail in Barstow, he again failed to appear for a scheduled court date and a warrant was again issued for his arrest; he fled California for Nevada and was eventually apprehended by bounty hunters in Las Vegas, who found him hiding in the closet of a private homeowner on April 13, 2016.

On June 5, 2016, Brown was arrested in Las Vegas by police while leaving a local hotel known for prostitution and illegal drug sale and use. He refused to cooperate with officers after they stopped his taxicab, and a subsequent search found him to be in possession of methamphetamine and a pipe, and that he had an outstanding warrant for his arrest, in relation to one of his unresolved domestic battery charges. He was charged with drug possession, possession of drug paraphernalia, and resisting arrest.

Several months later, on September 2, 2016, Brown, recently released from a medical facility where he'd been hospitalized for undisclosed reasons, was arrested after breaking into Legends Restaurant & Venue, a Las Vegas establishment owned by his childhood friend Danny Boy, and attempting to change the locks. Police found Brown on the roof of the building, after security cameras showed him entering the building without permission.

In early 2016, Brown debuted to the public a new tattoo, that of his former That's So Raven co-star Raven-Symoné, on his neck. Later that year, he entered rehab, after an intervention from friends and family, but remained in the program only one week, and was photographed shortly after his release walking down the street barefoot, carrying a box of wine.

On December 22, 2022, Brown was arrested in Lima, Ohio on charges of domestic violence. The charge, which was revealed to be on misdemeanor domestic violence, involved allegedly threatening his brother with a hammer and a broken off knife blade. Jail records afterwards showed that Brown was being held in Allen County jail on no bond.

Dr. Phil appearance 

In 2018, Brown appeared on an episode of Dr. Phil, and made false claims, among them that he was the son of musical icon Michael Jackson, saying his full name was Orlando Brown Prince Michael Jackson Jr., and that he had four children, two of whom he had never met and whose names he did not know. He claimed the oldest of his children is between the ages of 16 and 18, meaning Brown would have been between 13 and 15 at the time of their birth. He additionally claimed he had been sober for four years. The episode aired on December 21, 2018.

Personal life

Since his appearance on the Dr. Phil show, Brown has admitted to his past addictions and opened up about his struggles at a church fundraising event in 2020.

He was seen in 2021 with his wife and son.

At the time of his December 22, 2022 arrest, Brown was revealed to be now homeless and living with his brother, who claimed that he took Brown into his home two weeks prior so he could avoid living in a homeless shelter.

Filmography

Film

Television

Discography

Albums

Soundtracks

Songs

References

External links

 Orlando Brown
 Orlando Brown on Instagram
 Orlando Brown on Twitter
 Orlando Brown on SoundCloud
 Orlando Brown on YouTube

1987 births
Living people
20th-century American male actors
21st-century American male actors
21st-century American rappers
21st-century American singers
African-American male actors
African-American male child actors
African-American male rappers
African-American male singers
American male child actors
American male film actors
American male singers
American male television actors
American male voice actors
Male actors from California
Male actors from Los Angeles
Rappers from Los Angeles
Singers from Los Angeles